is a railway station on the Aizu Railway Aizu Line in Aizuwakamatsu, Fukushima Prefecture, Japan, operated by the Aizu Railway..

Lines
Ashinomaki-Onsen-Minami Station is served by the Aizu Line, and is located 17.7 rail kilometers from the official starting point of the line at Nishi-Wakamatsu Station.

Station layout
Ashinomaki-Onsen-Minami Station has a single side platform serving traffic in both directions. The station is unattended.

Adjacent stations

History
The station was renamed to its present name on July 16, 1987.

Surrounding area
 Japan National Route 118

External links
 
 Aizu Railway Station information

References

Railway stations in Fukushima Prefecture
Aizu Line
Railway stations in Japan opened in 1932